Evodinus borealis is the species of the Lepturinae subfamily in long-horned beetle family. This beetle is ranged from Atlantic coasts through Eurasian continent to Pacific coasts.

Subtaxa 
There are two varietets in species:
 Evodinus borealis var. fulvipennis Plavilstshikov 
 Evodinus borealis var. obscurissimus Pic

References

Lepturinae
Beetles described in 1827